Ponnuraj Karthe is an Indian structural biologist and a professor and the head of the Department of Crystallography and Biophysics of the University of Madras. He is known for his research in the fields of structural biology and drug designing. His studies have been documented by way of a number of articles  and Google Scholar, an online repository of scientific articles has listed 46 of them. Besides, he has contributed chapters to books edited by others and has delivered invited speeches at many seminars which include the Workshop on Advances in Computer Aided Drug Design held in August 2010 at the University of Madras. He was a member of the national organizing committee of the Annual Conference of Indian Biophysical Society -
Molecular Architecture, Dynamics and Assem, organized by Saha Institute of Nuclear Physics and serves as a member of the national committee of the International Union for Pure and Applied Biophysics (IUPAB) as well as the executive council of the Bioinformatics and Drug Discovery Society (BIDDS), a non governmental organization promoting dissemination of knowledge in the fields of bioinformatics, biological sciences and other life sciences. The Department of Biotechnology of the Government of India awarded him the National Bioscience Award for Career Development, one of the highest Indian science awards, for his contributions to biosciences, in 2010.

Selected bibliography

Chapters

Articles

See also 

 Catechol
 Histidine utilizing Protein

Notes

References

External links 
 

N-BIOS Prize recipients
Indian scientific authors
Living people
Academic staff of the University of Madras
Indian medical researchers
Year of birth missing (living people)
Scientists from Tamil Nadu
Structural biologists